Marios Pechlivanis (born 23 May 1995) is a Cypriot footballer, who plays for Olympiakos Nicosia.

References

1995 births
Living people
Sportspeople from Nicosia
Cypriot footballers
Cypriot First Division players
Cyprus under-21 international footballers
Cyprus youth international footballers
Olympiakos Nicosia players
APOEL FC players
AEL Limassol players
Association football midfielders